The Lady Has Plans is a 1942 American comedy film spy thriller film directed by Sidney Lanfield and starring Ray Milland, Paulette Goddard and Roland Young. It was produced ad distributed by Paramount Pictures as a World War II espionage film set in neutral Portugal.

Plot 
A gang of criminals murder a scientist, steal plans for a "radio-controlled torpedo" and have them tattooed in invisible ink on the back of a woman named Rita, planning to sell them to the highest bidder. Paul Baker then murders the tattooer. Rita is to take the place of reporter Sidney Royce (Paulette Goddard) on an airplane bound for Lisbon. Baker has informed the British and the Nazis to contact "Sidney" there for the auction. Joe Scalsi is given the task of making sure that Sidney does not board the plane, but he is taken into custody by government agents. Rita witnesses this.

Meanwhile, the real Sidney Royce is being sent to Lisbon to work for the very demanding Kenneth Harper, who has fired the last four reporters. They were all men, so Mr. Weston decides to try sending a woman instead.

Cast 
 Ray Milland as Kenneth Clarence Harper
 Paulette Goddard as Sidney Royce
 Roland Young as Ronald Dean
 Albert Dekker as Baron Von Kemp 
 Margaret Hayes as Rita Lenox
 Cecil Kellaway as Peter Miles
 Addison Richards as Paul Baker
 Edward Norris as Frank Richards
 Charles Arnt as Pooly
 Hans Schumm as 1st German
 Hans von Morhart as 2nd German
 Genia Nikolaieva as German Maid
 Gerald Mohr as Joe Scalsi
 Lionel Royce as Guard

Reception 
Bosley Crowther panned the film in his New York Times review, calling it a "silly fable, without rhyme or reason" and a "thoroughly implausible tale".

Adaptations 
The Lady Has Plans was adapted for The Lux Radio Theatre, with William Powell and Rita Hayworth replacing Milland and Goddard in the title roles. It was aired on April 26, 1943.

References

External links 
 
 

Films scored by Leigh Harline
Films directed by Sidney Lanfield
1940s English-language films
1940s spy comedy films
American spy comedy films
American comedy thriller films
Films set in Lisbon
1942 films
Paramount Pictures films
American black-and-white films
1942 comedy films
1940s American films